HIT Universe is an Indian Telugu-language shared Universe of crime thriller films created by Sailesh Kolanu.

The first film of the universe HIT: The First Case was released on 28 February 2020  and the second installment  HIT: The Second Case was released on 2 December 2022. It is currently the Eleventh highest-grossing Telugu film series worldwide.

Development 
“I had written both the stories based on news reports in other countries, and it is eerie to see such real-life similarities prior to the release of these films,” says Sailesh.

On 24 October 2019, the ceremonial pooja of The First Case was held and production for the film commenced. Nani and Prashanti Tipirneni produced the film under "Wall Poster Cinema" banner. This film is their second venture after Awe. A teaser was launched on 1 January 2020. The film's title is an acronym for "Homicide Intervention Team".

After the success of HIT: The First Case, Nani announced a sequel in February 2021, one year after the film's release. Sailesh Kolanu who directed the first film of the franchise would be directing this. Adivi Sesh has replaced Vishwak Sen in the sequel. Nani wanted the franchise to be "concept oriented" rather than "star oriented," so he moved the setting from Telangana to Andhra Pradesh and chose Sesh as the protagonist. Meenakshi Chaudhary was cast opposite Sesh. Sen said he missed out on the sequel due to scheduling conflicts, and wished he'd be part of HIT 3 or 4.

Films

HIT: The First Case (2020) 

The first installment of the HIT Universe, it stars Vishwak Sen in the lead role, along with Ruhani Sharma. The story follows Vikram Rudraraju is a police officer in the Telangana CID, where he works in the Homicide Intervention Team (HIT), and is a sharp person, who solves crucial cases with his ability to capture even the smallest of details.Who is tasked with investigating the missing case of an eighteen-year-old girl.

HIT: The Second Case (2022) 

The second installment of the HIT Universe, it stars Adivi Sesh, Meenakshi Chaudhary and Rao Ramesh. The story follows Krishna Dev, shortly known as KD is a SP in the Homicidal Intervention Team (HIT) of Andhra Pradesh in Vishakapatnam, who is accomplished for his presence of mind and quickness in nabbing criminals.

HIT: The Third Case (TBA) 
The third installment of the HIT Universe, it stars Nani in the lead role.

Cast and Characters

Reception

Box office performance

See also
 YRF Spy Universe
Cop Universe
Dinesh Vijan's horror-comedy universe
 Lokesh Cinematic Universe

References 

Indian film series
Action film franchises
Fictional universes
Shared universes
Continuity (fiction)